Börde-Hakel is a municipality in the district of Salzlandkreis, in Saxony-Anhalt, Germany. It was formed on 1 January 2010 by the merger of the former municipalities Etgersleben, Hakeborn and Westeregeln.

References

Salzlandkreis